Patty Fendick and Meredith McGrath were the defending champions, but lost in the semifinals to Lindsay Davenport and Arantxa Sánchez Vicario.

Davenport and Sánchez Vicario won the title by defeating Gigi Fernández and Martina Navratilova 7–5, 6–4 in the final.

Seeds

Draw

Draw

References

External links
 Official results archive (ITF)
 Official results archive (WTA)

Silicon Valley Classic
1994 WTA Tour